Föritztal is a municipality in the Sonneberg district of Thuringia, Germany. It was formed on 6 July 2018 by the merger of the former municipalities Föritz, Judenbach and Neuhaus-Schierschnitz. It takes its name from the small river Föritz, a tributary of the Steinach.

Subdivisions
The municipality Föritztal consists of the following villages:

References

Sonneberg (district)
Duchy of Saxe-Meiningen